Kunzea peduncularis, commonly known as mountain burgan, is a flowering plant in Myrtaceae, the myrtle family, and is endemic to Victoria, Australia. It is usually a dense shrub and has lance-shaped to egg-shaped leaves with the narrower end towards the base. Dense groups of white flowers appear in early summer.

Description
Flowering occurs between November and January.

Taxonomy and naming
Kunzea peduncularis was first formally described in 1855 by Ferdinand von Mueller from a specimens found "at the foot of the Australian Alps on the banks of rivers and rivulets". The description was published in his book Definitions of rare or hitherto undescribed Australian plants. The specific epithet (peduncularis) is derived from the Latin word pedunculus meaning "small, slender stalk".

This kunzea was formerly included in Kunzea ericoides but that species is now regarded as a New Zealand endemic.

Distribution and habitat
Mountain burgan grows in montane and subalpine woodland in eastern Victoria, usually at altitudes above .

Use in horticulture
Kunzea peduncularis is suitable for use as a screening plant. It grows best in full sun in well-drained soils and attracts butterflies.

References

peduncularis
Flora of Victoria
Myrtales of Australia
Plants described in 1855